The Encyclopedia of Ethics is a scholarly work with the original focus on ethical theory. It is published by Routledge and includes "biographical articles, entries on areas and issues related to ethics, treatment of major traditions in religious ethics, coverage of applied ethical issues of importance to theory, survey articles on the history of ethics, and information on the current status of philosophical ethics worldwide."

The editors in chief of the three-volume second edition of this Encyclopedia are Lawrence C. Becker and Charlotte B. Becker.

See also
 Routledge Encyclopedia of Philosophy

References

External links
 

English-language encyclopedias
Ethics books
Encyclopedias of philosophy
Routledge books